Asmah Haji Omar is a Malaysian linguist. She is an emeritus professor at the Academy of Malay Studies, University of Malaya (UM). She was formerly Dean of the Faculty of Languages and Linguistics of the university. She was invited by Sultan Idris Education University, Tanjong Malim, Perak, to occupy the Za'ba Chair of Malay Civilization, and established the Institute of Malay Civilization (2001 - 2005) after retiring.

References 

1940 births
Living people
Academic staff of the University of Malaya
Malaysian people of Malay descent
Malaysian Muslims
Linguists from Malaysia
Malaysian non-fiction writers
People from Kedah
Academic staff of Sultan Idris Education University